The Great Bear is a 2011 Danish computer animated adventure film directed by Esben Toft Jacobsen. The film was also translated to English for international viewers.

Cast
Danish version:
Markus Rygaard as Jonathan (voice)
Alberte Blichfeldt as Sophie (voice)
Flemming Quist Møller as Jægeren (voice)
Elith Nulle Nykjær as Morfar (voice)

English version:
Oliver Lambert as Jonathan (voice)
Lilly Lambert as Sophie (voice)
Jules Werner as The Hunter (voice)
Adrian Diffey as Grandfather (voice)

Dutch version:
Machiel Verbeek as Jonathan (voice)
Lotte Kuijt as Sophie (voice)
Jan Nonhof as Grandfather (voice)

See also
Copenhagen Bombay

References

External links

2011 films
2011 animated films
Danish adventure films
Danish animated fantasy films
2010s Danish-language films
Animated films about bears